Petar Radaković (22 February 1937 – 1 November 1966) was a Yugoslav football player. 
He got 19 caps for Yugoslavia. He is famous for scoring the winning goal in the 1962 World Cup quarter-final win against Germany (1–0).

He spent his whole career playing for NK Rijeka and is considered a legend of the club.

He died from a heart attack during training, age 29.

Club career
Radaković started playing football in his hometown club NK Rijeka, then called NK Kvarner, in 1952. Radaković made his first appearance for the senior team on 13 August 1954 in a Cup match against NK Lokomotiva in which he scored a goal with the match ending 5:1.

During his first five seasons Rijeka gained promotion from the Third to the First League. In 1959 played in Rijeka's first semi-final match. They lost 2:0 to Red Star Belgrade. In the 1960-61 season Radaković was named the best player in NK Rijeka and the best right winger in Yugoslavia. He was also named the best right winger in Yugoslavia in 1962 and 1963.

Even though he had offers from many Belgrade clubs who were dominating the First League at the time he stayed at Rijeka.

Radaković made 408 appearances for the club scoring 68 goals.
Radaković was Rijeka's first national team player and first player to appear in the FIFA World Cup. He holds the record for the fastest scored goal in the club's history; three seconds.

Death
Radaković first started having heart problems during a ten-day tour of West Germany in the spring of 1963. Two years later, in the spring of the 1964–65 season, by the physician's recommendations he took some time to rest. After three, months he returned to the field in the last game of the season against Red Star Belgrade. But the match was turned out to be too early for him to play after the match he had to undergo intensive treatment, examinations and therapies. 
The first match in 1966–67 season against Željezničar at Kantrida, marked his return. His first two matches of the season went by without an incident but on the third, against Hajduk, his heart could not endure and he himself asked to be substituted after only 25 minutes of the match. But he continued to train, was persistent and did not believe the doctors when they said he would no longer be able to run on the field, enjoy the atmosphere of the game, hear the applause from the stands.

On 1 November 1966, Radaković died of a heart attack during training. He was buried at Trsat cemetery on 2 November 1966 in front of 15,000 people.

International career
From 1959 to 1961 he was called up for the Yugoslavia U-21 team and Yugoslavia B team.

He made his debut for Yugoslavia on 18 June 1961 against Morocco. He made 19 appearances and scored 3 goals. He played at the 1962 FIFA World Cup where Yugoslavia finished in fourth place His final international was a September 1964 friendly away against Austria.

International appearances

International goals

Honours

Rijeka
Yugoslav Second League (1): 1957–58

Individual
NK Rijeka player of the season: 1960–61
Best Right Winger in Yugoslavia: 1961, 1962, 1963
Rijeka sportsperson of the year: 1962
NK Rijeka all time XI

Tribute
Since 1969 NK Rijeka has hosted a youth tournament as a tribute to the player named Memorijal Petar Radaković where four youth clubs compete every year. In 1972 NK Rijeka opened its youth academy and named it after the Youth football academy Petar Radaković.

Radaković was named in NK Rijeka's all time XI in 2008 by Marinko Lazzarich and in 2011 by Novi list.

During May 2012, Armada Rijeka, NK Rijeka's fans, created a mural near Stadion Kantrida in his honor.

References

External links
 
 Profile on Serbian federation official site
NK Rijeka.hr

1937 births
1966 deaths
Footballers from Rijeka
Association football midfielders
Yugoslav footballers
Yugoslavia international footballers
1962 FIFA World Cup players
HNK Rijeka players
Association football players who died while playing
Sport deaths in Yugoslavia